Michael Tracey may refer to:

 Michael Tracey (journalist), an American journalist and Twitter personality
 Michael Tracey (producer), a British-American academic, mostly known for his involvement in the JonBenét Ramsey case
 Tracy 168, name used by Michael Tracy, a graffiti artist